
Year 62 BC was a year of the pre-Julian Roman calendar. At the time it was known as the Year of the Consulship of Silanus and Murena (or, less frequently, year 692 Ab urbe condita). The denomination 62 BC for this year has been used since the early medieval period, when the Anno Domini calendar era became the prevalent method in Europe for naming years.

Events 
 By place 

 Roman Republic 
 January 5 – The forces of the conspirator Catiline are defeated by the loyal Roman armies of Antonius Hybrida led by Marcus Petreius in the Battle of Pistoria.
 Julius Caesar divorces Pompeia, following the sacrilege of Publius Clodius Pulcher.
 Cicero delivers his Pro Archia Poeta in defense of Aulus Licinius Archias' claim to Roman citizenship.
 Cato the Younger, as tribune, presents a lex frumentaria (enacting a grain dole).
 Metellus Nepos, also tribune, leaves Rome.
 Caesar and Bibulus are praetors.

 Commagene 
 King Antiochus I Theos of Commagene builds his mountain-top tomb-sanctuary at Mount Nemrut.

Births 
 Ptolemy XIII Theos Philopator, king (pharaoh) of Egypt (d. 47 BC)

Deaths 
 Lucius Sergius Catilina, Roman politician (b. 108 BC)
 Quintus Roscius Gallus, Roman actor (b. c. 126 BC)
 Zhang Anshi, Chinese official of the Han Dynasty

References